Brian Anthony Joseph McGuire (13 December 1945 – 29 August 1977) was a racing driver and constructor from Australia.

Racing career and death
McGuire travelled over to the UK from Australia with another hopeful young driver, Alan Jones, but did not enjoy his countryman's success. McGuire entered two Formula One British Grands Prix. With his privately run Williams FW04 at the 1976 British Grand Prix, he found himself as a reserve entry and was denied a chance to compete.

For the 1977 race, he modified his Williams FW04 and renamed it the McGuire BM1, but failed to pre-qualify. McGuire was killed practicing this car during a Shellsport G8 Championship race at Brands Hatch later that year.

Career results

Complete European F5000 Championship results
(key) (Races in bold indicate pole position; races in italics indicate fastest lap.)

Complete Shellsport International Series results
(key) (Races in bold indicate pole position; races in italics indicate fastest lap.)

Complete Formula One World Championship results
(key) (Races in bold indicate pole position, races in italics indicate fastest lap)

Complete non-championship Formula One results
(key) (Races in bold indicate pole position, races in italics indicate fastest lap)

References
 "The Grand Prix Who's Who", Steve Small, 1995.
 1976 Shellsport International Series, GEL Motorosport Information - The Formula One Archive, retrieved 27 April 2011.
 1977 Shellsport G8 International Series, GEL Motorosport Information - The Formula One Archive, retrieved 27 April 2011.

1945 births
1977 deaths
Australian Formula One drivers
McGuire Formula One drivers
Racing drivers from Melbourne
Racing drivers who died while racing
Sport deaths in England